Eric Beddows is the pen name of Ken Eric Nutt (born November 29, 1951), a Canadian artist and award-winning illustrator of children's books.

He was born in Woodstock, Ontario and studied fine arts at York University from 1970 to 1972. He moved to Stratford, Ontario and worked various jobs at a gallery there. He illustrated Tim Wynne-Jones's 1983 book Zoom at Sea which won the Amelia Frances Howard-Gibbon Illustrator's Award, the Ruth and Sylvia Schwartz Children's Book Award and the Imperial Order Daughters of the Empire (IODE) Toronto Award for best children's book. He worked with Wynne-Jones on two more books in the same series: Zoom Away (1985), which won the Amelia Frances Howard-Gibbon Illustrator's Award, and Zoom Upstream (1992), which was a finalist for the Governor General's Award for English-language children's illustration.

His pseudonym combines his middle name with his mother's maiden name. He has used it for his illustrative work since 1986 to distinguish it from his work as an artist.

His art has been shown at Gallery Stratford, the Woodstock Art Gallery and the Art Gallery of Windsor.

Selected work 
 The Emperor's Panda (1986) text by David Day
 The Cave of Snores (1987) text by Dennis Haseley
 Joyful Noise: Poems for Two Voices (1988) poetry by Paul Fleischman, received the Newbery Medal
 Night Cars (1989) text by Teddy Jam (pen name used by Matt Cohen), received the IODE Toronto book award and the Elizabeth Mrazik-Cleaver Canadian Picture Book Award
 Who Shrank My Grandmother's House? Poems of Discovery (1992) text by Barbara Esbensen, named a Notable Book by the American Library Association
 The Rooster's Gift (1996) text by Pam Conrad, received the Governor General's Award for illustration

References

External links
 Archives of Eric Beddows (Eric Beddows fonds, R11703) are held at Library and Archives Canada

1951 births
Living people
Artists from Ontario
Governor General's Award-winning children's illustrators